Madison Airport may refer to:
	
 Central Kentucky Regional Airport, formerly Madison Airport, in Richmond, Kentucky, United States (FAA: I39)
 Madison Municipal Airport (Georgia) in Madison, Georgia, United States (FAA: 52A)
 Madison Municipal Airport (Indiana) in Madison, Indiana, United States (FAA:IMS)
 Madison Municipal Airport (South Dakota) in Madison, South Dakota, United States (FAA: MDS)

Other airports in places named Madison:
 Lac qui Parle County Airport in Madison, Minnesota, United States (FAA: DXX)
 Bruce Campbell Field in Madison, Mississippi, United States (FAA: MBO)
 Dane County Regional Airport in Madison, Wisconsin, United States (FAA: MSN)
 Blackhawk Airfield, near Madison, Wisconsin, United States (FAA: 87Y)

See also 
 Madison County Airport (disambiguation)